Banryūyama Takaharu  (born 4 May 1951 as Takaharu Taguchi) is a former sumo wrestler from Tatsuno, Hyōgo, Japan. He made his professional debut in November 1966, and reached the top division in March 1975. His highest rank was komusubi. He retired in November 1984 and became an elder of the Japan Sumo Association under the name Matsuchiyama. He worked as a coach at Mihogaseki stable until its closure in 2013, whereupon he moved to Kasugano stable. Upon reaching the mandatory retirement age of 65 in May 2016 he was re-hired as a consultant for five more years. He left the Sumo Association upon turning 70 in May 2021.

Career record

See also
Glossary of sumo terms
List of past sumo wrestlers
List of sumo elders
List of komusubi

References

1951 births
Living people
Japanese sumo wrestlers
Sumo people from Hyōgo Prefecture
Komusubi